Tropidocarpum is a genus of flowering plants in the family Brassicaceae. There are two to four species, one of which is extremely rare. Tropidocarpum capparideum, the caper-fruited tropidocarpum, is a plant endemic to California generally considered to be extinct since the 1950s, but has been reported since. Specimens were collected at Fort Hunter Liggett, California, in 2000 and 2001. Its status is currently in debate. The other member of the genus, the dobie pod, T. gracile, is a common mustardlike plant in California and Baja California. It is proposed that two other plants in separate monotypic genera, Twisselmannia and Agallis, be moved to Tropidocarpum.

Species
Accepted species as of March 2014:

Tropidocarpum californicum (Al-Shehbaz) Al-Shehbaz
Tropidocarpum capparideum Greene
Tropidocarpum gracile Hook.
Tropidocarpum lanatum (Barnéoud) Al-Shehbaz & R.A.Price

References

 Al-Shehbaz, I. A. (2003). A synopsis of Tropidocarpum (Brassicaceae). Novon 13:4 392-5

External links
 Jepson Manual Treatment
 USDA Plants Profile
 Center for Plant Conservation: T. capparideum

Brassicaceae
Brassicaceae genera